"Autumn Leaves" is a popular song and jazz standard composed by Joseph Kosma in 1945 with original lyrics by Jacques Prévert in French (original French title: "Les Feuilles mortes"), and later by Johnny Mercer in English. An instrumental version by pianist Roger Williams was a number one best-seller in the US Billboard charts of 1955.

Background
Kosma was a native of Hungary who was introduced to Prévert in Paris. They collaborated on the song  ("The Dead Leaves") for the 1946 film Les Portes de la nuit (Gates of the Night) where it was sung by Irène Joachim and Yves Montand. The poem was published, after the death of Jacques Prévert, in the book "Soleil de Nuit" in 1980. Kosma was influenced by a piece of ballet music, "Rendez-vous" written for Roland Petit, performed in Paris at the end of the Second World War, large parts of the melodies are exactly the same, which was itself borrowed partially from "Poème d'octobre" by Jules Massenet. Johnny Mercer wrote the English lyric and gave it the title "Autumn Leaves". Mercer was a partner in Capitol Records at the time, and Capitol recording artist Jo Stafford made the first English-language recording in July, 1950.

Structure and chord progression

The song is in AABC form. "Autumn Leaves" offers a popular way for beginning jazz musicians to become acquainted with jazz harmony as the chord progression consists almost solely of ii–V–I and ii–V sequences which are typical of jazz. Although it is in most times played in G minor, the original key of the composition was A minor.

The song's iv7–bVII7–bIIImaj7–bVImaj7–iiø7–V7–i chord progression is an example of the circle-of-fifths progression.

Other versions
As a jazz standard, "Autumn Leaves" has accumulated more than a thousand commercial recordings.

The song was recorded steadily throughout the 1950s by leading pop vocalists including Steve Conway (1950), Bing Crosby (1950), Nat King Cole (1955), Doris Day (1956), and Frank Sinatra (1957). It was also quickly adopted by instrumental jazz artists including Artie Shaw (1950), Stan Getz (1952), Erroll Garner and Ahmad Jamal (separately in 1955), Duke Ellington (1957), Cannonball Adderley and Miles Davis, Vince Guaraldi (all 1958), and John Coltrane (1962, maybe earlier). Roger Williams made the song a number-one hit in the U.S. in 1955, the first piano instrumental to reach number one.

Composer Terry Riley has written a contrafact of the song (1965), using the same principle of small repetitive cells of melody and rhythm first put in use in his breakthrough piece, In C (1964).   

In 2012, jazz historian Philippe Baudoin called the song "the most important non-American standard" and noted that "it has been recorded about 1400 times by mainstream and modern jazz musicians alone and is the eighth most-recorded tune by jazzmen."

The song is heavily referenced in "La Chanson de Prévert", a song by Serge Gainsbourg.

References

External links
 "Autumn Leaves" at jazzstandards.com

1940s jazz standards
1945 songs
1955 singles
Number-one singles in the United States
Pop standards
Torch songs
Eva Cassidy songs
Jerry Lee Lewis songs
Manfred Mann songs
The Coasters songs
Nat King Cole songs
Songs with lyrics by Johnny Mercer
Compositions by Joseph Kosma